Elisavetpol may refer to
 Elizavetpol Governorate, a guberniya of the Russian Empire
 Elizavetpol uezd, an uezd of the Russian Empire
 Ganja, Azerbaijan, Azerbaijan's second most populous city